Daniel Iliuță Popa (born 14 July 1995) is a Romanian professional footballer who plays as a forward for Chindia Târgoviște in the Liga I.

Honours
Chindia Târgoviște
Liga III: 2014–15

Dinamo București
Cupa Ligii: 2016–17

External links 
 
 

1994 births
Living people
People from Dâmbovița County
Romanian footballers
Association football midfielders
Liga I players
Liga II players
Liga III players
FCM Târgoviște players
AFC Chindia Târgoviște players
FC Dinamo București players
FC Botoșani players
K League 2 players
Daejeon Hana Citizen FC players
Romanian expatriate footballers
Expatriate footballers in South Korea
Romanian expatriate sportspeople in South Korea